Marawi, officially the Islamic City of Marawi (Maranao: Inged a Marawi), is a 4th class component city and capital of the province of Lanao del Sur, Philippines. According to the 2020 census, it has a population of 207,010 people.

Marawi is located upon the shores of Lake Lanao. It is primarily inhabited by the Maranao people. The city is also called the "summer capital of the south" due to its higher elevation and cooler climate, a nickname it shares with Malaybalay.

On May 23, 2017, the city suffered extensive damage during the Battle of Marawi as militants affiliated with the Islamic State of Iraq and the Levant invaded the city and engaged in a massive urban gunfight. The ensuing battle lasted until October 23, 2017, when Defense Secretary Delfin Lorenzana announced the ending of the battle. Major damage of the city was mostly caused by airstrikes carried out by the Philippine Air Force in an attempt to eliminate the militants.

Etymology
Dansalan (Marawi's prior name) derived from the Mëranaw word "dansal", which means rendezvous; literally, it also means arrival (in other source, "where the waves come to shore"). Being known as the destination point for arriving boats, the place refers to a port, hence, the "Place of Destination and Purpose."

Meanwhile, Marawi is derived from the word "rawi", which means reclining, in reference to Agus River. On the other hand, this present name is in honor of the city's martyred hero in Kuta Maraghui (Fort Marawi) in 1895.

History

As Dansalan
Dansalan began as a port area.

Around the original Meranaw fortification, Spanish captain Francisco Atienza founded a settlement called Dansalan in October 1639. His forces had come from Iligan and were attempting to conquer the entire Lake Lanao area. However, it was abandoned later the same year when thousands of Meranaw soldiers invested the then-fortifying settlement, pressing the Spaniards hard and thus they returned to Iligan, having failed in their quest.

The Spaniards only returned to the area when they began the conquest of the Sultanate of Maguindanao in the 19th century. They made attempts to capture fort Marahui, the stronghold of the Maranao, twice until they succeeded in 1895 with the deaths of Datu Amai Pakpak and Datu Sinal. They abandoned the place again upon the arrival of the Americans in the country in 1898.

Dansalan was created as a municipality by the Moro Province legislative council on May 24, 1907; served as the capital of the undivided Lanao province since its declaration by the American Colonial Government.

A sovereign of Marawi before 1639 was "Datu Buadi Sa Kayo" who imposed taxation.

It was in this municipality when,  on March 18, 1935, a group of 189 Maranao leaders and its leader, Hadji Abdulhamid Bongabong of Unayan, signed a document known as the Dansalan Declaration, urging then United States President Franklin Roosevelt and its Congress to grant Mindanao and Sulu separate independence by the US instead of inclusion in the country's independence.

Cityhood (1940), renaming as Marawi (1956), and later developments

Dansalan was the last to become a chartered city under the country's Commonwealth era with the approval of Commonwealth Act No. 592 on August 19, 1940, however, after the Second World War, inauguration took place on September 30, 1950. It was renamed Marawi City on June 16, 1956 through Republic Act (RA) No. 1552 which amended the charter.

Upon division of Lanao province through RA No. 2228 in 1959, it was made capital of Lanao del Sur.

The city, being the country's only predominantly Muslim chartered city, was declared "Islamic City of Marawi" through City Council Resolution No. 19-A on April 15, 1980. This was proposed by Parliamentary Bill No. 261 in the defunct Batasang Pambansa, the country's former parliament during the Marcos regime, reportedly to attract funds from the Middle East.

Siege of Marawi (2017)

On May 23, 2017, a pro–Islamic State of Iraq and the Levant group called the Maute group attacked the city. The battle of Marawi—also known as the Marawi siege, the Marawi clash, and the Marawi crisis—started on May 23. CNN Philippines reported that the militants had over 500 men. Philippine President Rodrigo Duterte declared martial law on the island of Mindanao, where the fighting was taking place, initially until December 31, 2017, but was later extended to the end of 2018 and then again to the end of 2019. The city was liberated from militant control on October 17 and battle operations officially ended on October 23.

Post-battle period

On January 30, 2018, it was announced that a 10-hectare military base will be established in the city to prevent the reentry of terrorists.

2023 creation of additional barangays
On March 18, 2023, the Commission on Elections (COMELEC) held plebiscites in the city to create two barangays. The plebiscites for the establishment of Boganga II out of Boganga (City Ordinance 07-010 series of 2022), and Datu Dalidigan out of Sagonsongan (City Ordinance 05-010 series of 2022), marked the first exclusively local electoral exercise in the city post-siege.

The plebiscites were held in two barangays, a school in each, with 5 polling precincts. With  of registered voters participated, majority of them later separately ratified both city ordinances.

Meanwhile, COMELEC explained that these new villages, whose creation is expected to be done in the later months, will not be contested in the Barangay and Sangguniang Kabataan elections in October.

Geography

It is located on the northernmost shores of Lake Lanao and straddles the area where the Agus River starts. It is bounded to the north by the municipalities of Kapai and Saguiaran; to the south by Lake Lanao; to the east by the municipalities of Bubong and Ditsaan-Ramain; and to the west by the municipalities of Marantao and Saguiaran.

The protected area was established on August 5, 1965, by Republic Act no. 4190. The park is ideal for birdwatching and mountain climbing to the summit that features a small pond.

Topography
Mountains, rolling hills, valleys, and a large placid lake dominate the city's landscape.  Angoyao Hills (Barangay Sogod) served as natural viewpoint over the water of the Lake Lanao.  Signal Hill (Barangay Matampay), Arumpac Hill (Barangay Saduc), and Mt. Mupo (Barangay Guimba) are considered beautiful but mysterious.  Mt. Mupo, located within the Sacred Mountain National Park, is known for its untouched trees and beautiful, perfect cone.

Barangays
Marawi is politically subdivided into 98 barangays.

 Ambolong
 Bacolod Chico Proper
 Banga
 Bangco
 Banggolo Poblacion
 Bangon
 Biaba-Damag
 Bito Buadi Itowa
 Bito Buadi Parba
 Bubonga Pagalamatan
 Bubonga Lilod Madaya
 Boganga
 Boganga II
 Boto Ambolong
 Bubonga Cadayonan
 Bubong Lumbac
 Bubonga Marawi
 Bubonga Punod
 Cabasaran
 Cabingan
 Cadayonan
 Cadayonan II
 Calocan East
 Calocan West
 Kormatan Matampay
 Daguduban
 Dansalan
 Datu Dalidigan
 Datu Saber (Navarro)
 Datu Sa Dansalan
 Dayawan
 Dimaluna
 Dulay
 Dulay West
 East Basak
 Emie Punud
 Fort
 Gadongan
 Buadi Sacayo (Green)
 Guimba (Lilod Proper)
 Kapantaran
 Kilala
 Lilod Madaya (Poblacion)
 Lilod Saduc
 Lomidong
 Lumbaca Madaya (Poblacion)
 Lumbac Marinaut
 Lumbaca Toros
 Malimono
 Basak Malutlut
 Gadongan Mapantao
 Amito Marantao
 Marinaut East
 Marinaut West
 Matampay
 Pantaon (Langcaf)
 Mipaga Proper
 Moncado Colony
 Moncado Kadingilan
 Moriatao Loksadato
 Datu Naga
 Olawa Ambolong
 Pagalamatan Gambai
 Pagayawan
 Panggao Saduc
 Papandayan
 Papandayan Caniogan
 Paridi
 Patani
 Pindolonan
 Poona Marantao
 Puga-an
 Rapasun MSU
 Raya Madaya I
 Raya Madaya II
 Raya Saduc
 Rorogagus Proper
 Rorogagus East
 Sabala Manao
 Sabala Manao Proper
 Saduc Proper
 Sagonsongan
 Sangcay Dansalan
 Somiorang
 South Madaya Proper
 Sugod Proper
 Tampilong
 Timbangalan
 Tuca Ambolong
 Tolali
 Toros
 Tuca
 Tuca Marinaut
 Tongantongan-Tuca Timbangalan
 Wawalayan Calocan
 Wawalayan Marinaut
 Marawi Poblacion
 Norhaya Village

Climate

Marawi's weather is warm and wet throughout the year.

Demographics

Language
Maranao or Meranaw is widely spoken in Marawi; however, local inhabitants can also speak Maguindanao, Iranun, English and Tagalog.

Religion

Marawi is predominantly a Muslim city, with Muslims accounting for 99.6% of the population. Sharia criminal law exists but without stoning, amputations, flagellations, or other punishments typically associated with Sharia as they are against the law of the Philippines. The distribution of alcoholic products and gambling is forbidden and women must cover their heads, though non-Muslims are exempted from this rule. Other than sharia law in personal matters, these laws are not applicable elsewhere in Lanao del Sur.

Economy

The economy of Marawi is largely based on agriculture, trading, and exporting. Most industries in the city are agriculture-oriented. They include rice and corn farming, hollow blocks manufacturing, goldsmithing, and saw milling. Small and cottage-size enterprises are engaged in garment making, mat and malong weaving, wood carving, brassware making, web development, and blacksmithing.

Apart from that, Marawi is home to NPC – Agus 1 Hydro Electric Power Plant and the first of the six cascading Agus Hydro Power Plants.

A new wind and solar energy plant and a new diesel-generated power plant are set to be developed in Saguiaran, Lanao del Sur, by two private firms to provide electricity to Marawi and adjoining areas. The project will cost PHP 2 billion and will generate 10 to 30 megawatts of electricity.

Culture

Architecture
The feeling of the unique natural setting of the Maranaos in Marawi is manifested by the presence of many large Torogans, an antique royal high-roofed houses with carvings designed by the Meranau, and the Sambitory Old Building in Barrio Naga in front of Tuaka Laput, Marawi.

Government
List of Mayors

Education

Marawi is home to the main campus of Mindanao State University, the biggest state university in Philippines. Other institutions and colleges are well established in the city and are as follows:

Other notable secondary schools are:

TESDA is also stationed in Marawi which caters to technical training of students for the province.

Within the Mindanao State University is the Aga Khan Museum of Islamic Arts which is named in honor of Sultan Aga Khan who contributed to the realization of the museum. Historical development of the country is bank on the large space upon the conservation of cultural materials. It has huge, collection of indigenous art, displayed ethnic music tape recorded, the native folk dances from different regions of Mindanao, Sulu and Palawan, the native tools and weapons used by the Muslims and different artistic designs of houses are the main attractions of museum. Indigenous art and cultural material are being displayed.

Sister cities
Local
Malaybalay
Iligan
Zamboanga City
Cotabato City
Lamitan
Butuan
Cagayan de Oro

See also
 List of renamed cities and municipalities in the Philippines

References

External links

 Marawi Profile at the DTI Cities and Municipalities Competitive Index
 [ Philippine Standard Geographic Code]
 Marawi City Profile at the Autonomous Region in Muslim Mindanao Official Website

 
Cities in Bangsamoro
1907 establishments in the Philippines
Mountain resorts in the Philippines
Populated places established in 1907
Populated places in Lanao del Sur
Populated places on Lake Lanao
Provincial capitals of the Philippines
Component cities in the Philippines